Desmin Borges (born 1983/1984) is an American actor.  He is best known for playing Edgar Quintero on the FX/FXX comedy-drama You're the Worst.

Borges grew up in Chicago and received his Bachelor of Fine Arts in Theater at DePaul University. , Borges was living in New York City. His father is from Puerto Rico and his mother is of Italian and Greek ancestry.

Filmography

References

External links
 
 

21st-century American male actors
Male actors from Chicago
American male film actors
American male television actors
Living people
DePaul University alumni
American people of Puerto Rican descent
1984 births
Theatre World Award winners
American people of Italian descent
American people of Greek descent